Ferrovie dello Stato Italiane S.p.A. (Italian State Railways), previously only Ferrovie dello Stato S.p.A., in acronym FS, is Italy's national state-owned railway holding company that manages transport, infrastructure, real estate services and other services in Italy and other European countries.

History

Early years

The company was instituted by an act on 22 April 1905, taking control over the majority of the national railways, which up until that time were privately owned and managed. The president was nominated by the government. The first Director General was Riccardo Bianchi.

In June 1912 Ferrovie dello Stato owned 5021 steam locomotives, 151 railcars, 10,037 coaches, 3371  baggage cars and 92,990 goods wagons.

With the rise of Fascism, a centralization policy was carried out. The board of directors and chief administrator office were abolished at the end of 1922. The institution was administered by a commissioner, appointed by the King until April 1924.
Since then, Ferrovie dello Stato was managed by the newly born Ministry of Communications (including rail transport), under Costanzo Ciano.

After the armistice on 8 September 1943, Italy was divided and train operations were separately directed too, with headquarters in Salerno for the south and Verona for the north. At the end of 1944, the Ministry of Communications was split and the new Ministry of Transport was created, including the general management of Ferrovie dello Stato, and in 1945, the company was renamed Azienda Autonoma delle Ferrovie dello Stato.

From World War II to 1985

The period after World War II was particularly tough for Ferrovie dello Stato, since most of the Italian rail network was severely damaged and the rolling stock was obsolete. The network was rebuilt almost entirely by 1952. Since then, a period of renewal started. New trains were introduced, among them the ETR 300, and many sections of the national network were electrified and sometimes doubled.

In 1957, the new ALn 442/448 multiple unit was introduced, greatly reducing travel time on the Italian network. During these years, the rolling stock was generally renewed and expanded with the mass construction of electrical and diesel multiple units, like the Ale 883, ALe 840 and ALn 772.
The FS ALn 668 diesel multiple unit was introduced in 1956.
In the following years, 3 MU out of 4 were 668, which replaced many older units.
Many electrical multiple units were also introduced during this period, like the ALe 601, progenitor of the Ale 801/940 and ALe 803 EMU, still in use today on regional service.

During the 1970s, a new generation of electronically operated railcars and power trains were first introduced on the Italian network, starting with the G.A.I. (Gruppo Aziende Italiane) trains for regional and metropolitan service.

The ETR 401 (1976) was the first prototype of the new Pendolino class. Following other network improvements, works for the first Italian high-speed rail line started in these years.
The Direttissima line from Florence to Rome was partially opened in 1986 and concluded in 1992. The line was the fastest in Europe after the French TGV lines.

The FS was left unchanged in its administrative structure until the end of 1985. From the following year, after 80 years, the Azienda Autonoma delle Ferrovie dello Stato was replaced by a new company, Ferrovie dello Stato.

1986–present

The newly born Ferrovie dello Stato underwent major structural transformations between 1986 and 1992. The workforce was reduced to half: from 216,310 employees in 1988 to 112,018 in 1999. Divisions were created to rationalize the management.

The organisation was converted from a government agency to a state-owned enterprise in 1992 with the creation of the new Ferrovie dello Stato SpA, a joint-stock company, following a European guideline. However, it was not privatized: it remained fully owned by the Italian Government.

On 1 June 2000, the company's two main divisions, service and infrastructure, were separated and two different independent companies were created: Trenitalia, responsible for transport service, and Rete Ferroviaria Italiana, responsible for the management of the rail infrastructure. Both companies were still subsidiaries of Ferrovie dello Stato Holding SpA.
In 2011 Ferrovie dello Stato Italiane bought the German Netinera.

In July 2016 Busitalia (part of Ferrovie dello Stato Italiane) purchased the Dutch company Qbuzz. In February 2017 Trenitalia bought from National Express the British train operating company c2c. In September 2017, an agreement to buy 100% of TrainOSE (the Greek railways) for €45 million was signed.

Company structure

Subsidiaries

Bluferries 
Blufferies is a subsidiary company of Ferrovie dello Stato (Italy's Rail Infrastructure Manager) that operates ferries across the Strait of Messina. It provides transport across the strait for passengers, cars and trains. The company employs approximately 130 people.

Trenitalia
Trenitalia is the most important subsidiary of the company, as it manages all the trains of the company group. Trenitalia is the primary train operator in Italy. It was established in 2000 following a European Union directive on the deregulation of rail transport.

Hellenic Train and others
Other company subsidiaries include Hellenic Train, the sole operator for passenger and the main for freight services in Greece, which is under the company's management since 2017, Busitalia, Centostazioni, Fercredit, Ferservizi, FS Logistica, FS Sistemi Urbani, Grandi Stazioni, Italferr, Netinera, Rete Ferroviaria Italiana, which manages the infrastructure of the Italian rail network, and Mercitalia, the group's freight operations subsidiary, founded in 2017.

ANAS
ANAS manages the construction and maintenance of motorways and state highways in Italy.

Ferry service
Ferrovie dello Stato Italiane owns and operates a ferry service for rail trains connecting the mainland to Sicily, crossing the Strait of Messina. They carry InterCity, InterCityNotte and goods wagon by means of ferry boats.

Until 2009 there was another ferry service for freight transport, which was activated in 1961 to connect the continent to the Sardinia, between Civitavecchia and Golfo Aranci.
Since 2010, after the regular service has been suspended, there is an on-call service for Messina Marittima and Villa San Giovanni Mare.

Former CEOs
The former company CEOs were: Lorenzo Necci (1989–1996), Giancarlo Cimoli (1996–2004), Elio Catania (2004–2006), Mauro Moretti (2006–2014), Michele Mario Elia (2014–2015), Renato Mazzoncini (2015–2018) and Gianfranco Battisti (2018-2021).

See also 
Transport in Italy
Rail transport in Italy

Notes

Bibliography 
  (public domain)

External links

Official website

 
Italian companies established in 1905
Companies based in Rome
Government-owned companies of Italy
Railway companies established in 1905
Railway companies of Italy
Italian brands